Hervé Grenier (born 4 December 1967) is a French former professional tennis player.

Born and raised in Montbrison, Grenier turned professional in 1992 and made his only ATP Tour main draw appearance as a qualifier at the 1994 Grand Prix de Tennis de Lyon. He reached his career best singles world ranking of 443 in 1995 and featured that year in the qualifying draw for the French Open.

Grenier's son Hugo is a tennis player, currently competing on the ATP Tour. He is also the uncle of basketball player William Howard, who is the son of one of his sisters.

References

External links
 
 

1967 births
Living people
French male tennis players
People from Montbrison, Loire
Sportspeople from Loire (department)